The X-Files is an American sci-fi/drama television series that aired from 1993 until 2002.

X-Files may also refer to:

The X-Files (comics), original tie-in comics from the 1990s
The X-Files (composition), the instrumental by Mark Snow used in the series
The X-Files (film), Fight the Future, a 1998 film based on the series
The X-Files (franchise), a franchise based upon the series
The X-Files: The Album, 1998 soundtrack album for the 1998 film
The X-Files: Original Motion Picture Score, 1998 film score album for the 1998 film
The X-Files Collectible Card Game, a collectible card game by US Playing Card Company
The X-Files Game, a 1998 video game
X-files unit, a fictional case that has been deemed unsolvable by the FBI, as referred to in the series

See also
Ancient X-Files